There are currently 97 pitchers and 90 records in the 1,000 Strikeout Club:

Progression
Shawn Andaya broke the original strikeout record by Amy Unterbrink during her 1987 campaign. Michele Granger struck out her 1,235th batter on February 22, 1993, shutting out the Northwestern Wildcats 8–0. Courtney Blades struck out her 1,641st batter on May 6, 2000, defeating the USF Bulls in relief.

Cat Osterman surpassed Courtney Blades' career strikeout total on 25 February 2006, striking out Brittany Bolinger of the UNLV Lady Rebels. Monica Abbott went on to surpass Osterman's total on 6 May 2007, striking out Charlotte Morgan of the Alabama Crimson Tide.

Angela Tincher became just the third pitcher to reach the 2,000 strikeout plateau on April 30, 2008, striking out Sissy Jimenez of the East Carolina Pirates.

Strikeout Ratio
In addition, there are currently 26 pitchers in the 1,000 Strikeouts Club that averaged double-digit strikeouts for their career from a list of 33 NCAA career records:

No. 1 Cat Osterman (7IP = 14.3Ks); No. 2 Angela Tincher (7IP = 13.4Ks); No. 3 Sara Plourde (7IP = 12.0Ks); No. 4 Monica Abbott (7IP = 11.7Ks); No. 6 Sarah Pauly (7IP = 11.5Ks); No. 7 Alicia Hollowell (7IP = 11.0Ks); No. 8 Danielle Lawrie (7IP = 10.9Ks); No. 9 Blaire Luna (7IP = 10.9Ks); No. 10 Miranda Kramer (7IP = 10.9Ks); No. 11 Nicole Newman (7IP = 10.8Ks); No. 12 Megan Betsa (7IP = 10.7Ks);  No. 13 Katie Burkhart (7IP = 10.7Ks); No. 15 Sara Groenewegen (7IP = 10.6Ks); No. 16 Anna Thompson (7IP = 10.5Ks); No. 17 Kelly Barnhill (7IP = 10.5Ks); No. 18 Keilani Ricketts (7IP = 10.4Ks);  No. 20 Kylie Reynolds (7IP = 10.2Ks); No. 21 Taryne Mowatt (7IP = 10.1Ks); No. 22 Jennie Ritter (7IP = 10.1Ks); No. 23 Brooke Mitchell (7IP = 10.0Ks); No. 25 Morgan Childers (7IP = 10.0Ks); No. 27 Jordan Taylor (7IP = 10.0Ks); No. 29 Sarah Hamilton (7IP = 10.0Ks); No. 31 Jen Mineau (7IP = 10.0Ks);  No. 32 Anjelica Selden (7IP = 10.0Ks); No. 33 Aimee Creger (7IP = 10.0Ks).

Records & Milestones
Eileen Canney tied the NCAA and Junior Class records for single game strikeouts with 28 in 2006. Angela Tincher struck out the Sophomore Class record of 26 and NCAA top-10 record with 19 in 7-innings on five different occasions. Michele Granger struck out the Senior Class record 26 strikeouts and set the NCAA record for a 7-inning game with 21 in 1993. Nicole Myers struck out 25 in 2001; Danielle Lawrie and Cat Osterman each fanned 24 and 20 (7-innings), with Osterman tallying 24 twice. Darcy Wood, Katie Burkhart (who did it twice), Lauren Bay Regula and Anjelica Selden each struck out 23. Jamie Southern, Monica Abbott, Sara Plourde, Jen Mineau, Brooke Mitchell, Savannah Jo Dorsey and Kristina Thorson each nabbed 22 strikeout games. Alexis Osorio recorded 21 strikeouts to tie the NCAA single regulation game record. Alicia Hollowell, Abbott and Plourde also each struck out 20 in 7-innings, Hollowell and Plourde tying for the Sophomore Class record and Abbott setting the Freshman Class record for a regulation game. Sarah Pauly, Keilani Ricketts and Miranda Kramer struck out 19 in 7-innings. Finally, Lisa Ishikawa, Kelsie Armstrong, Kelly Barnhill, Courtney Blades, Burkhart, Jenna Caira, Morgan Childers, Courtnay Foster, Danielle Henderson (did it three times), Trinity Johnson, Taryne Mowatt, Nicole Newman, Mellissa Santos, Anna Thompson, Amy Unterbrink and Stephanie VanBrakle all whiffed 18 in 7-innings. Note: these totals represent the top-10 single game totals in a game of any length for the club up to the 7-inning game records, as well as only each pitchers' personal career highlights within that top-10 list.

Monica Abbott set the NCAA season and Senior Class records with 724 strikeouts in 2007; she also set the Sophomore and Freshman Class records with 603 and 582 respectively. Sara Plourde struck out the least in a non-injury season for the list with just 67 in 2009. Angela Tincher set the Junior Class record with 617 in 2007. Cat Osterman set the single season strikeout ratio at 15.4 in 2006, she struck out 630 that season. She also owns the Junior (15.2) and Sophomore (14.1) ratio marks in addition. Tincher (679 in 2008), Courtney Blades (663 in 2000), Osterman in 2006, (593 & 554 in 2005 & 2002) and Plourde (556 in 2010) all rank top-10 for season strikeouts in the NCAA. Abbott (14.1 in 2007), Danielle Henderson (13.9 with 465 strikeouts in 1999), Tincher (13.8, 13.8 & 13.7 in 2008, 2007 and 2006 with 504) all rank top-10 for strikeout ratio in an NCAA season; Osterman owns the career ratio of 14.3, while Amanda Macenko has the lowest ratio for the list at 6.6 for her career. Along with Blades in 2000, Osterman in 2002–2006, Abbott in 2004 & 2007, Tincher in 2008 and Plourde in 2010, Lisa Ishikawa (469 in 1984), Amy Unterbrink (370 in 1986), Shawn Andaya (326 in 1987), Michele Granger (327, 463, 329 & 484 in 1990–1993), Trinity Johnson (367 & 399 in 1995 & 1997), Henderson (430 in 1998), Blades (497 in 1999), Amanda Renfroe (421 in 2001), Danielle Lawrie (521 in 2009), Plourde (498 & 541 in 2011–2012), Blaire Luna (422 in 2013), Aimee Creger (354 in 2014), Miranda Kramer (439 in 2015), Savannah Jo Dorsey and Sara Groenewegen (both 336 in 2016), Megan Betsa (412 in 2017), Nicole Newman (423 in 2019) all led the NCAA for strikeouts those years. Granger (strikeout ratios 8.2 & 10.4 in 1990–1991), Johnson (strikeout ratio 11.5 in 1997), Henderson (strikeout ratio 11.8 in 1998 and ratio in 1999), Blades (strikeout ratio 11.6 in 2000), Nicole Myers (strikeout ratio 10.9 in 2001 with 403 strikeouts), Osterman (strikeout ratio 12.7 in 2002 and ratios in 2003–2006), Alicia Hollowell (strikeout ratio 12.1 in 2004 with 508 strikeouts), Abbott (ratio in 2007), Tincher (ratio in 2008), Plourde (strikeout ratios 12.5 & 12.2 in 2010 & 2012), Luna (strikeout ratio 11.7 in 2013), Groenewegen (strikeout ratio 11.5 in 2014), Kramer (strikeout ratio 12.6 in 2015), Kelly Barnhill (strikeout ratio 13.0 in 2017) and Newman (strikeout ratio 13.3 in 2019) all led in strikeout ratio for those years in the NCAA.

Finally, along with Lawrie in 2009 with 49 strikeouts at the WCWS and Andaya in 1987 also with 49 at the WCWS, Jennie Finch (279 & 26 strikeouts at WCWS in 2001), Jocelyn Forest (379 & 33 strikeouts at WCWS in 2002), Keira Goerl (342 & 44 strikeouts at WCWS in 2003; 276 & 22 strikeouts at WCWS in 2004), Jennie Ritter (417 & 60 strikeouts at WCWS in 2005), Hollowell (420 & 64 strikeouts at WCWS in 2006), Taryne Mowatt (250 strikeouts in 2006 and 522 & 76 at WCWS in 2007), Katie Burkhart (513 & 54 strikeouts at WCWS in 2008), Dallas Escobedo (326 & 38 strikeouts at WCWS in 2011) and Keilani Ricketts (350 & 39 strikeouts at the WCWS in 2013) all won National Championships those years; Mowatt set the Women's College World Series strikeout record in 2007. For their careers Abbott (SEC), Osterman (Big 12), Tincher (ACC), Lawrie (Pac-12), Plourde (A-10), Galati (CAA), Myers (A-Sun), Pauly (Big South in three seasons), Jamie Southern (WAC), Mitchell (Sun Belt), Toni Paisley (USA), Sarah Dawson (Southland), Kylie Reynolds (MAC), Nicole Newman (MVC), Jordan Taylor (Big Ten), Santos (MAAC), Samantha Iuli (Horizon), Caira (Big East) and Bonnie Bynum (OVC) all own the strikeouts crown for these conferences.

References

Links
NCAA Division I softball career wins list
NCAA Division I softball career -1.00 ERAs list

College softball in the United States lists